"These Hard Times" is the second single (worldwide except Australia) from rock band Matchbox Twenty's first compilation album Exile on Mainstream (2007).

The video premiered on iTunes on Tuesday, February 5, 2008. It was released to Australian radio during the week of April 13. In the United States, the single performed disappointingly, failing to chart the Billboard Hot 100 but reaching the Top Ten of the Adult Top 40.

It was released as a follow-up to "All Your Reasons", which was released only in Australia, and although not an official single in Australia, "These Hard Times" was serviced to radio there; it did not gain much airplay.

Music video
The video features the band playing in the street in front of what appears to be a warehouse. Many people pass by as if nothing is happening. Near the end of the song, several colored balloons come out of a gutter and the warehouse's doors open, letting more and more balloons out. All the people seen in the video stop and look upwards to the balloons. The video ends when the band stops playing and stares at the balloons as well.

The video was directed by Ramon & Pedro.

Track listing
 "These Hard Times" (album version)
 "Bright Lights" (Live from Wal-Mart Soundcheck)

EP version
"These Hard Times" – 3:48
"3 AM" (live soundcheck version) – 3:51
"Bright Lights" (live soundcheck version) – 4:38

Personnel
Rob Thomas - lead vocals, melodica
Kyle Cook - electric guitar, backing vocals, glockenspiel
Paul Doucette - acoustic guitar, piano, backing vocals, Casio guitar
Brian Yale - bass
Ryan MacMillan - drums

Charts

Weekly charts

Year-end charts

References

External links
 Matchbox Twenty official website

2008 singles
Matchbox Twenty songs
Songs written by Rob Thomas (musician)
Song recordings produced by Steve Lillywhite
Songs written by Paul Doucette
Songs written by Kyle Cook
Songs written by Brian Yale
2007 songs
Atlantic Records singles